The U.S. Post Office-Helper Main at 45 S. Main in Helper, Utah was built in 1938.   It has also been known as Helper Main Post Office.  It was listed on the National Register of Historic Places in 1989. The post office is located in the Helper Commercial District.

It includes a mural by artist Jenne Magafan.

References

Government buildings completed in 1938
Buildings and structures in Carbon County, Utah
Neoclassical architecture in Utah
Post office buildings on the National Register of Historic Places in Utah
National Register of Historic Places in Carbon County, Utah